Blender is the fifth studio album by the American rock band Collective Soul released in 2000. The album is considered by many to be the band's most pop-oriented album to date. This was their final album for Atlantic Records and also their least successful with the label.

Track listing
All songs written by Ed Roland, except where noted.

Personnel
 Ross Childress – lead guitar, backing vocals
 Shane Evans – drums, percussion
 Ed Roland – lead vocals, guitar, keyboards
 Dean Roland – rhythm guitar
 Will Turpin – bass guitar, percussion, backing vocals
 Jack Joseph-Puig – mix engineer
 Richard Ash – second mix engineer
 Anthony J. Resta;- synthesizers, programming, mellotron, drums on "Ten Years Later"

Charts

Year-end charts

References

2000 albums
Albums produced by Ed Roland
Atlantic Records albums
Collective Soul albums